Year 938 (CMXXXVIII) was a common year starting on Monday (link will display the full calendar) of the Julian calendar.

Events 
 By place 

 Europe 
 Summer – The Hungarian army invades Northern Italy with the permission of King Hugh of Arles. They cross the Apennines, and sack the Lombard lands in Tuscany, Lazio and Campania. Finally, the Hungarians are defeated at Wolfenbüttel by a Saxon army.
 July – King Otto I besieges the fortress of Eresburg. He defeats his half-brother Thankmar and kills him as he tries to find sanctuary. Eberhard III, duke of Franconia, is banished and replaced by his uncle Berthold.
 Fall – Otto I defeats in two campaigns a series of uprisings in Saxony, Franconia and Lotharingia. He signs a "friendship pact"  with King Louis IV ("d'Outremer") of the West Frankish Kingdom.

 Asia 
 Battle of Bach Dang: Vietnamese forces defeat an invading force of the Southern Han state at the Bach Dang River. This put an end to Chinese imperial domination in Vietnam after nearly 1,000 years.
 The Sixteen Prefectures, which includes the area around modern-day Beijing, are absorbed in the Khitan Empire.

Births 
 September 14 – Sahib ibn Abbad, Buyid grand vizier (d. 995)
 Almanzor, Umayyad vizier and de facto ruler (approximate date)
 Beatrice of France, duchess regent of Upper Lorraine (approximate date)
 García Fernández, count of Castile and Álava (approximate date)
 Olaf the Peacock, Icelandic merchant and chieftain (approximate date)
 Romanos II, Byzantine emperor (d. 963)
 Sancho II, king of Navarre (approximate date)

Deaths 
 February 3 – Zhou Ben, general of Wu (b. 862)
 July 28 – Thankmar, half-brother of Otto I (during the Siege of Eresburg)
 Lady Ise, Japanese noblewoman and poet (b. 875) (approximate date)
 Lady Peng, noblewoman of Chu (Ten Kingdoms)
 Muhammad ibn Ja'far al-Khara'iti, Abbasid theologian
 Shen Song, chancellor of Wuyue (b. 863)

References